The 2020–21 season was Chelsea's 107th competitive season, 32nd consecutive season in the top flight of English football, 29th consecutive season in the Premier League, and 115th year in existence as a football club. The season covered the period from 1 July 2020 to 30 June 2021.

Prior to the 2020–21 season, Chelsea made numerous high-profile signings in the transfer market, bringing in the likes of Timo Werner, Kai Havertz, Ben Chilwell, Hakim Ziyech, and Thiago Silva in the off-season, as well as Édouard Mendy shortly after the season began. The Blues began this season under the management of former Chelsea player Frank Lampard, in his second season at the club. However, Lampard was sacked in January and replaced by the German manager Thomas Tuchel. The season culminated in the club's second European Cup victory, as on 29 May 2021, Chelsea defeated fellow English side Manchester City in the Champions League final to be crowned champions of Europe.

The season was the first since 2013–14 without Willian, who departed to Arsenal.

Kits

Season overview

On 25 January 2021, manager Frank Lampard was sacked after a poor run of form that included only two wins from their past eight league matches. The following day, he was replaced by former Borussia Dortmund and Paris Saint-Germain manager Thomas Tuchel. With Chelsea's victory over Atlético Madrid on 17 March, Tuchel became the first manager to go unbeaten in his first 13 matches in charge of the club, surpassing the previous record of 12 held by Luiz Felipe Scolari.

On 2 April, Tuchel was honoured with the Premier League Manager of the Month award for March. His unbeaten streak ended on 3 April, when Chelsea unexpectedly lost to West Bromwich Albion 2–5 at home. On 17 April, Chelsea beat Manchester City 1–0 to advance to the FA Cup Final.

On 18 April, it was announced that Chelsea would be a founding member of the newly formed European Super League, a proposed annual club football competition to be contested by twenty of Europe's most elite football clubs. On 20 April, after two days of widespread backlash from the United Kingdom government including Prime Minister Boris Johnson, FIFA, UEFA, the FA, other Premier League clubs, supporters, players, and broadcasters, and after Chairman Bruce Buck met with players, Chelsea announced their intention to withdraw from the competition.  This led to the five other English clubs all pulling out later that night. By 21 April, the Super League announced it was suspending its operations.

On 5 May, Chelsea defeated Real Madrid in the second leg of their Champions League semi-final clash to book a place in the final to be held on 29 May in Istanbul. Their win set up an all-English affair after Manchester City had secured their maiden appearance in the final the day before.

Despite a loss on the final day of the league season against Aston Villa, Chelsea secured a place in next season's UEFA Champions League as Leicester City also lost at home to Tottenham Hotspur.

On 29 May, Chelsea defeated fellow English club Manchester City 1–0 in the Champions League Final to win the competition for the second time in club history. This was Chelsea's third appearance in a European Cup/Champions League final, after their defeat to Manchester United in 2008 and their victory against Bayern Munich in 2012.

Management team

Players

Squad information
Players and squad numbers last updated on 29 May 2021. Appearances include all competitions.Note: Flags indicate national team as has been defined under FIFA eligibility rules. Players may hold more than one non-FIFA nationality.

a. Additional costs of £10 million to be paid.

Transfers

In

Summer

Winter

Out

Summer

Notes

Winter

Loan out

Summer

Winter

Overall transfer activity

Expenditure
Summer:  £222,520,000

Winter:  £0

Total:  £222,520,000

Income
Summer:  £68,400,000

Winter:  £0

Total:  £68,400,000

Net totals
Summer:  £154,120,000

Winter:  £0

Total:  £154,120,000

Pre-season friendlies

Competitions

Premier League

League table

Results summary

Results by matchday

Matches

FA Cup

Chelsea got the right to enter the 2020–21 FA Cup in the Third Round Proper along with the other Premier League and Championship clubs. The third round draw was made on 30 November, and Chelsea were drawn against League Two side Morecambe. The draw for the fourth and fifth round were made on 11 January, conducted by Peter Crouch. In the fourth round, Chelsea overcame Championship club Luton Town by a score of 3–1, with Tammy Abraham scoring all three goals for his side. In doing so, Abraham became the first Englishman to a score a hat-trick for Chelsea in the FA Cup since manager Frank Lampard in 2007, and he became the first Chelsea youth team product to score ten or more goals in back-to-back seasons since Mike Fillery in 1982–83. The match against Luton Town was Lampard's last in charge as he was sacked the following day. The draw for the quarter-finals was made, live on BT Sport by Karen Carney on 11 February. The draw for the semi-finals was made, live on BBC One by Dion Dublin on 21 March. Chelsea reached the 2021 FA Cup Final after defeating Manchester City 1–0 in the semi-final with a goal from Hakim Ziyech. However, Chelsea would end up losing the final 1–0 to Leicester City following a controversial a goal from Youri Tielemans.

EFL Cup

The draw for both the second and third round were confirmed on September 6, live on Sky Sports by Phil Babb. In the third round, Chelsea were drawn at home against Championship side Barnsley. Tammy Abraham opened the scoring in the 19th minute, slotting past former Blues keeper Brad Collins. New signing, Kai Havertz, then latched on to Mason Mount's pass after a clever Abraham dummy and slid left-footed effort into the bottom corner to open his Chelsea account. Ross Barkley made it three after the break before Abraham's neat flick teed Havertz up for a simple finish inside the area. Abraham then found Havertz for his hat-trick goal in the 65th minute and Olivier Giroud finished the scoring to make it 6–0 with seven minutes to go.

The fourth round draw was conducted on 17 September 2020 by Laura Woods and Lee Hendrie live on Sky Sports; Chelsea were handed an away game against Tottenham Hotspur, led by former manager José Mourinho. Chelsea went in front against Spurs with new signing Timo Werner netting his first goal for the club in the 19th minute. However, Erik Lamela would equalize for Tottenham with six minutes to go and the hosts would go on to win in the penalty shoot-out after a solitary miss from Chelsea midfielder Mason Mount.

UEFA Champions League

The group stage draw was held on 1 October 2020 with Chelsea being placed in Group E along with Europa League holders Sevilla and two competition debutants in Krasnodar of Russia and Stade Rennes of France. Chelsea progressed as group winners having won four matches and drawing the other two. This included a convincing 4–0 away win versus Sevilla with Olivier Giroud scoring all four. In the draw for the round of 16, Chelsea were pitted against Spanish side Atlético Madrid, setting up the eighth and ninth matches between the clubs in just over a decade, following group stage clashes in 2009–10, a solitary matchup in the 2012 UEFA Super Cup, a semi-final tie in 2013–14, and another group stage meeting in the Champions League in 2017–18. Chelsea would go on to win the first leg 1–0 after a goal from Olivier Giroud. Chelsea moved on to the quarter-finals after a 2–0 second-leg win, with a goal in each half from Hakim Ziyech and Emerson, and were drawn against FC Porto. It was the ninth meeting between the two clubs, the most recent being a 2–0 Chelsea victory in the group stage of the 2015–16 UEFA Champions League. Chelsea defeated Porto 2–0 in the first match. They advanced 2–1 on aggregate despite losing 1–0 in the second leg to Porto. By doing this, Chelsea reached the Semi-finals, a feat they had not accomplished since 2013–14 campaign. Chelsea were drawn against Real Madrid in the Semi-finals. The first leg was played in the Alfredo Di Stéfano. Christian Pulisic gave Chelsea the lead before Karim Benzema equalized for the home side, the match ended in a 1–1 draw. In the second leg at Stamford Bridge, Timo Werner and Mason Mount gave Chelsea a 2–0 win (3–1 on aggregate). This meant that Chelsea would be in the final, the first time Chelsea had reached the final since the 2011–12 campaign. In the final at the Estádio do Dragão, Chelsea would emerge victorious against Manchester City 1–0 with a goal from Kai Havertz sealing their first Champions League title since the 2011–12 campaign.

Group stage

Knockout phase

Round of 16
The round of 16 draw was held on 14 December 2020.

Quarter-finals
The draw for the quarter-finals was held on 19 March 2021.

Semi-finals
The draw for the semi-finals was held on 19 March 2021, after the quarter-final draw.

Final

Statistics

Appearances and goals

Goalscorers

Top assists

Clean sheets

Discipline

Summary

Awards

Players

Manager

References

Chelsea F.C. seasons
Chelsea
Chelsea
Chelsea
Chelsea
UEFA Champions League-winning seasons